The Jackson Creek (sometimes referred to as Jacksons Creek) is a watercourse within the Port Phillip catchment, located in the outer northern suburbs of Melbourne, in the Australian state of Victoria.

Location and features

The creek flows east, then south, then south by east, joined by two minor tributaries before reaching its confluence with the Deep Creek to form the Maribyrnong River west of Melbourne Airport. In its upper reaches the creek flows east in a broad shallow valley in the Bullengarook area, then enters the deeper, narrower valley that characterises the remainder of the watercourse. The creek flows through the town of Gisborne before turning generally southwards to flow through  eventually to join with Deep Creek south of Bulla, where the two waterways form the Maribyrnong River. The deep and relatively narrow valley cut by the creek in its southward course through the surrounding basalt plains is particularly prominent at such places as Emu Bottom and the Organ Pipes National Park. The creek descends  over its  course.

The incised meanders of the Jackson Creek demonstrate the downcutting of the Newer Volcanics and have formed rapids and small falls, along with outcrops of columnar basalts and tessellated pavements, for example at the Organ Pipes National Park near the Calder Freeway, a prominent display of basaltic columns so named because they look like organ pipes. Upstream, a bluestone flour mill near the falls south of Sunbury harnessed the major drop in river levels.

Etymology
The creek was named after the early Colonial settlers William Jackson and his brother, Samuel, who named the township of Sunbury after Sunbury-on-Thames, in Surrey, England when it was established in 1857.

By inference, as Deep Creek has been called the east branch of the Maribyrnong River, Jackson Creek could be considered the west branch. The creek has also historically been called Saltwater River Western Branch, Gisborne Creek, Macedon River, Saltwater River, and Saltwater Creek.

Crossings
Named and other significant bridges and crossing points along Jackson Creek include:

 Holden Bridge (early concrete beam bridge replacing an earlier ford on Bulla - Diggers Rest Road)
 Jacksons Creek bridge (Sunbury, historic twin arch bluestone bridge, pedestrians only)
 Sunbury railway viaduct (constructed 1859 for Bendigo Rail Line)
 Black Hill Bridge (Settlement Road)
 Old Jacksons Creek Bridge (pedestrians only)
 Jacksons Creek Bridge (Riddell Road)
 Calder Freeway
 Gisborne - Kilmore Road
 Aitken Street
 Waterloo Flat Road

See also 

 List of rivers in Australia
 Yarra River

References 

Melbourne Water catchment
Rivers of Grampians (region)
Rivers of Greater Melbourne (region)
Rivers of Loddon Mallee (region)
Tributaries of the Maribyrnong River
City of Brimbank
City of Hume